is a former Japanese football player and manager. He is the current manager of Avispa Fukuoka.

Playing career
Hasebe was born in Yokohama on April 23, 1971. After graduating from Chuo University, he joined Verdy Kawasaki in 1994. He played many matches as a central midfielder and the club won the championship in 1994 J1 League. However his opportunity to play decreased from 1996 and he moved to Japan Football League club Kawasaki Frontale in August 1997. He played many matches at Frontale in 1997 and he moved to Vissel Kobe in 1998. He wore the number 10 shirt for the club and played as central player of the club. In 2001, he moved to JEF United Ichihara and he played many matches. However he struggled to make the first team in 2003 and he left the club in July.

Coaching career
After retiring, in 2006 Hasebe became a coach of Vissel Kobe youth team. In 2011, he became the coach of the first team. In 2016, he moved to J2 League side JEF United Chiba and became a coach of the club. In July, after manager Takashi Sekizuka was sacked, Hasebe was promoted to interim manager from coach on July 25, returning to the role of assistant coach after the appointment of Argentine manager Juan Esnáider on 25 November 2016. On 11 December 2017, he was named manager of the J2 League side Mito HollyHock from 2018.

Club statistics

Managerial statistics
Update; December 31, 2018

References

External links
 
 

1971 births
Living people
Chuo University alumni
Association football people from Kanagawa Prefecture
Japanese footballers
J1 League players
Japan Football League (1992–1998) players
Tokyo Verdy players
Kawasaki Frontale players
Vissel Kobe players
JEF United Chiba players
Japanese football managers
J1 League managers
J2 League managers
JEF United Chiba managers
Mito HollyHock managers
Avispa Fukuoka managers
Association football midfielders